Essex County Cricket Club was officially founded on 14 January 1876. Essex's team was elevated to first-class status in 1894 and the club joined the County Championship in 1895. It is one of eighteen county teams in England and Wales that play first-class cricket. The player appointed club captain leads the team in all fixtures except if unavailable.

 A. P. Lucas (1894)
 H. G. P. Owen (1895–1902)
 C. J. Kortright (1903)
 F. L. Fane (1904–1906)
 C. P. McGahey (1907–1910)
 J. W. H. T. Douglas (1911–1928)
 H. M. Morris (1929–1932)
 T. N. Pearce (1933–1938, 1946–1950)
 D. R. Wilcox (1933–1939)
 J. W. A. Stephenson (1939)
 F. S. Unwin (1939)
 D. J. Insole (1950–1960)
 T. E. Bailey (1961–1966)
 B. Taylor (1967–1973)
 K. W. R. Fletcher (1974–1985; 1988)
 G. A. Gooch (1986–1987; 1989–1994)
 P. Prichard (1995–1998)
 N. Hussain (1999)
 R. C. Irani (2000–2007)
 M. L. Pettini (2007–2010)
 J. S. Foster (2010–2015)
 R. N. ten Doeschate (2016–2019)
 T. Westley (2020– )

See also
 List of Essex CCC players

Notes

cricket
Essex
Essex County Cricket Club
Essex